(), also known as  for short, is a form of a long, one-piece robe in , which is characterized by the natural integration of the upper and lower part of the robe which is cut from a single fabric. The  was worn since the Zhou dynasty and became prominent in the Han dynasty. The  was a unisex, one-piece robe; while it was worn mainly by men, women could also wear it. It initially looked similar to the ancient ; however, these two robes are structurally different from each other. With time, the ancient  disappeared while the  evolved gaining different features in each succeeding dynasties; the  continues to be worn even in present day.

Terminology 

The term  is composed of the Chinese characters 《》, which literally means "robe", and 《》which literally means "clothing".

The Chinese character《袍》can be found in ancient texts dating prior to the Qin and Han dynasties, such as in the 《》.

Naming based on design 

  – a simple, loose-fitting robes with long, open sleeves, a style worn by men which provided a carefree look to its wearer.
 
 
  – long robe with a cross-collar closing which closes to the right; worn since the Zhou dynasty.
  vs  vs 
  – dragon robe.
It was typically worn by a deceased person.
  vs

Construction and design 

However, the difference between those two is the cut and construction of the garment. 

The  is composed of two parts: an upper garment called  and a lower garment called , which are then sewn together into a one-piece robe; and therefore, there is the presence of a middle seam where the two parts were connected together. The , on the other hand, has its upper and lower part made out of a single fabric leading to the absence of middle seam between the upper and lower part.

Typically the  closes on the right side in a style called  and was a very important symbol of cultural identity for the Han Chinese. The  could also be found closing on the left style called . The  with a  closure was generally associated with the dress of ethnic minorities and the Hufu; however, they could also be the funeral dress of the Han Chinese. It was also a possible for some living Han Chinese to adopt  with a  closure in geographical areas which were ruled by foreign nationalities.

History

Zhou dynasty 
In the Zhou dynasty,  was one of the basic clothing worn by the Han Chinese people, along with the Chinese trousers, called . The  was made with 2-length of fabric which started from the back hem and continued down to the front hem without discontinuity over the shoulders; they were then sewed at the central region of the back and under the arms which often allowed for side vents on the lower side seams to be formed. To form the sleeves, 2 additional pieces of fabrics were sewed together at the shoulder regions of the garment. It was left open in the front, and it could be closed at the waist with a tie or with a belt. Other pieces of fabric could be added to make the width at the sides bigger or to create the overlapping front of the robe.

Han dynasty 

The  became a prominent form of attire in the Han dynasty; it was mainly worn by men, although it was sometimes worn by women. In the Han dynasty,  was typically worn by the members of royalty and by the aristocrats as an outerwear. It was also the uniform of government officials. Around the 206 BC, the  worn by elders had large sweeping sleeves which would be tied tightly to the wrist. Elderlies started to wear the ankle-length  after 206 BC.

The  in the Han dynasty had linings; and it could be called  or  based on whether it was padded. It was padded or quilted for warmth. The sleeves were typically very wide and would become cinched at the wrists. It was also typically decorated with an embroidered dark-coloured band at the collar, front hem, and at the wrists.

Wei, Jin, Northern and Southern dynasties 

The  was a type of loose  with long ribbons for men. The  gave its wearer a casual and simple appearance. Loose type of clothing was often worn during leisure times as found in the depictions of the Seven Sages of the Bamboo groove where men had their upper clothing open, allowed their inner garment to be exposed, a knotted belt or sash which would tied to the upper garment at the chest level, and their skirts and lower garment would be held by a belt made of clothing which would be knotted at the front of the lower garment. 

The -style appears to have been a Northern Chinese style instead of a Southern Chinese style. The -style eventually became fashionable in the South.

The  style also appeared on the images of Buddha which dates from the late 5th century AD. The  style appears to have been a direct consequence of Emperor Xiaowen's Sinicization reforms in 486 AD. The popularity of the  style was very high, and it eventually replaced the Indian-style clothing (i.e. sanghati) which used to be depicted on the Buddha.

Sui and Tang dynasties 

However, Tang dynasty women also continued to wear long and loose  which was tied and knotted with a large sash at the hipline.

Song dynasty

Yuan dynasty

Ming dynasty 

In Ming dynasty, the  continued to be worn by commoner men; it was worn with an undershirt, loose trousers, and a sash around the waist.

Qing dynasty

Derivatives and influences

Japan 
The kimono was based on a type of Chinese  which was popular in the 8th century AD Japanese court.

Korea 
Chinese-style  influenced by the Han dynasty coexisted together with the native Korean  during the Three Kingdom period.

The  originated from the Chinese's ; it was introduced from the Tang dynasty was introduced during the Silla period.

See also 

 Hanfu
List of Hanfu
 
 Swallow-tailed Hems and Flying Ribbons clothing
  – Chinese upper garment

References 

Chinese traditional clothing